Leptocometes is a genus of beetles in the family Cerambycidae, containing the following species:

 Leptocometes acutispinis (Bates, 1863)
 Leptocometes barbiscapus (Bates, 1872)
 Leptocometes hispidus Bates, 1881
 Leptocometes luneli (Chalumeau & Touroult, 2005)
 Leptocometes nubilus (Melzer, 1934)
 Leptocometes obscurus (Monné, 1990)
 Leptocometes pallidus (Melzer, 1934)
 Leptocometes penicillatus (Monné, 1990)
 Leptocometes spinipennis (Bates, 1885)
 Leptocometes spitzi (Melzer, 1934)
 Leptocometes umbrosus (Thomson, 1864)
 Leptocometes virescens (Melzer, 1931)
 Leptocometes volxemi (Lameere, 1884)
 Leptocometes zikani (Martins & Monné, 1974)

References

 
Cerambycidae genera